Rubrius is a genus of South American tangled nest spiders first described by Eugène Simon in 1887.

Species
 it contains seven species found in Chile and Argentina:
Rubrius annulatus F. O. Pickard-Cambridge, 1899 – Chile
Rubrius antarcticus (Karsch, 1880) – Chile, Argentina
Rubrius castaneifrons (Simon, 1884) – Chile
Rubrius lineatus Roth, 1967 – Chile
Rubrius major (Simon, 1904) – Chile
Rubrius scottae Mello-Leitão, 1940 – Argentina
Rubrius ululus Roth, 1967 – Chile

References

Amaurobiidae
Araneomorphae genera
Spiders of South America
Taxa named by Eugène Simon